Isabel of Spain is the name of:

Isabella of Austria (1501–1526)
Infanta Isabella Clara Eugenia of Spain, arch-duchess of the Netherlands (1566–1633)
Isabel II of Spain (1830–1904)
Isabella, Princess of Asturias (1851–1931)